Galactica  may refer to:

Galactica (moth), a moth genus
 Battlestar Galactica, a fictional spacecraft and an American science fiction franchise
 Imperium Galactica, a computer game
 Galactica (roller coaster), at Alton Towers in Staffordshire, England

See also
 Galaxia (disambiguation)
 Galaxy (disambiguation)